In numerical analysis and scientific computing, truncation error is an error caused by approximating a mathematical process.

Examples

Infinite series 

In reality, we can only use a finite number of these terms as it would take an infinite amount of computational time to make use of all of them.  So let's suppose we use only three terms of the series, then

In this case, the truncation error is 

Example A:

Given the following infinite series, find the truncation error for  if only the first three terms of the series are used.

Solution

Using only first three terms of the series gives

The sum of an infinite geometrical series 
 
is given by
 

 

The truncation error hence is

Differentiation 

The definition of the exact first derivative of the function is given by

However, if we are calculating the derivative numerically,  has to be finite. The error caused by choosing  to be finite is a truncation error in the mathematical process of differentiation.

Example A:

Solution:

The approximate value is given by

The truncation error hence is

Integration 

Let  be a function defined on a closed interval  of the real numbers, and

be a partition of I, where

This implies that we are finding the area under the curve using infinite rectangles.  However, if we are calculating the integral numerically, we can only use a finite number of rectangles. The error caused by choosing a finite number of rectangles as opposed to an infinite number of them is a truncation error in the mathematical process of integration.

Example A.

For the integral

find the truncation error if a two-segment left-hand Riemann sum is used with equal width of segments.

Solution

We have the exact value as

Using two rectangles of equal width to approximate the area (see Figure 2) under the curve, the approximate value of the integral

Occasionally, by mistake, round-off error (the consequence of using finite precision floating point numbers on computers), is also called truncation error, especially if the number is rounded by chopping. That is not the correct use of "truncation error"; however calling it truncating a number may be acceptable.

Addition 
Truncation error can cause  within a computer when  because  (like it should), while . Here,  has a truncation error equal to 1. This truncation error occurs because computers do not store the least significant digits of an extremely large integer.

See also 
 Quantization error

References 

 
 .

Numerical analysis